Benedikt Doll (born 24 March 1990) is a German biathlete and Men's sprint 2017 World Champion.

Career 
He competed in the 2013/14 and 2014/15 World Cup seasons, and represented Germany at the Biathlon World Championships 2015 in Kontiolahti.

Biathlon results
All results are sourced from the International Biathlon Union.

Olympic Games
2 medals (2 bronze)

World Championships
5 medals (1 gold, 3 silver, 1 bronze)

*During Olympic seasons competitions are only held for those events not included in the Olympic program.
**The single mixed relay was added as an event in 2019.

Individual victories
4 victories (2 Sp, 1 In, 1 MS)

References

External links

1990 births
Living people
German male biathletes
Biathlon World Championships medalists
Biathletes at the 2018 Winter Olympics
Biathletes at the 2022 Winter Olympics
Olympic biathletes of Germany
People from Breisgau-Hochschwarzwald
Sportspeople from Freiburg (region)
Medalists at the 2018 Winter Olympics
Olympic medalists in biathlon
Olympic bronze medalists for Germany
21st-century German people